Melbourne Flats is a registered historic building in Cincinnati, Ohio, listed in the National Register on October 18, 1984.

Historic uses 
Multiple Dwelling

Notes 

National Register of Historic Places in Cincinnati
Residential buildings in Cincinnati